Stenosmia tagmouta is a species of bee, first discovered in 1991. No subspecies are listed in the Catalogue of Life.

References

Megachilidae
Insects described in 1991